Delvalle is a surname. Notable people with the surname include:

Alcibiades González Delvalle (born 1936), Paraguayan journalist, playwright, essayist, and novelist
Casiano Delvalle (born 1970), Paraguayan footballer
Eric Arturo Delvalle (1937–2015), Panamanian politician
Max Delvalle (1911–1979), Panamanian politician